Mandouri is a city in Togo. It is the seat of Kpendjal Prefecture in Savanes Region, located 48 km from the border with Ghana, 105 km from the city of Dapaong and about 600 km from the capital, Lomé.  The population is about 5,203 people (RGPH, 2010).

Populated places in Savanes Region, Togo